Belyayevo is the name of several rural localities in Russia.

Modern localities

Chelyabinsk Oblast
As of 2014, one rural locality in Chelyabinsk Oblast bears this name:

Belyayevo, Chelyabinsk Oblast, a settlement in Unkurdinsky Selsoviet of Nyazepetrovsky District;

Chuvash Republic
As of 2014, one rural locality in the Chuvash Republic bears this name:

Belyayevo, Chuvash Republic, a village in Aldiarovskoye Rural Settlement of Yantikovsky District;

Ivanovo Oblast
As of 2014, two rural localities in Ivanovo Oblast bear this name:
Belyayevo, Puchezhsky District, Ivanovo Oblast, a village in Puchezhsky District
Belyayevo, Yuryevetsky District, Ivanovo Oblast, a village in Yuryevetsky District

Kaluga Oblast
As of 2014, one rural locality in Kaluga Oblast bears this name:
Belyayevo, Kaluga Oblast, a village in Yukhnovsky District

Kirov Oblast
As of 2014, one rural locality in Kirov Oblast bears this name:

Belyayevo, Kirov Oblast, a selo in Potnyakovsky Rural Okrug of Kiknursky District;

Kursk Oblast
As of 2014, one rural locality in Kursk Oblast bears this name:
Belyayevo, Kursk Oblast, a selo in Belyayevsky Selsoviet of Konyshyovsky District

Lipetsk Oblast
As of 2014, two rural localities in Lipetsk Oblast bear this name:

Belyayevo, Prigorodny Selsoviet, Usmansky District, Lipetsk Oblast, a railway facility in Prigorodny Selsoviet of Usmansky District; 
Belyayevo, Studensky Selsoviet, Usmansky District, Lipetsk Oblast, a selo in Studensky Selsoviet of Usmansky District;

Mari El Republic
As of 2014, one rural locality in the Mari El Republic bears this name:

Belyayevo, Mari El Republic, a village in Shulkinsky Rural Okrug of Orshansky District;

Moscow Oblast
As of 2014, three rural localities in Moscow Oblast bear this name:

Belyayevo, Chekhovsky District, Moscow Oblast, a village in Stremilovskoye Rural Settlement of Chekhovsky District; 
Belyayevo, Lukhovitsky District, Moscow Oblast, a village in Fruktovskoye Rural Settlement of Lukhovitsky District; 
Belyayevo, Serebryano-Prudsky District, Moscow Oblast, a village in Uzunovskoye Rural Settlement of Serebryano-Prudsky District;

Nizhny Novgorod Oblast
As of 2014, five rural localities in Nizhny Novgorod Oblast bear this name:

Belyayevo, Ardatovsky District, Nizhny Novgorod Oblast, a village in Kuzhendeyevsky Selsoviet of Ardatovsky District; 
Belyayevo, Fedurinsky Selsoviet, Gorodetsky District, Nizhny Novgorod Oblast, a village in Fedurinsky Selsoviet of Gorodetsky District; 
Belyayevo, Smirkinsky Selsoviet, Gorodetsky District, Nizhny Novgorod Oblast, a village in Smirkinsky Selsoviet of Gorodetsky District; 
Belyayevo, Koverninsky District, Nizhny Novgorod Oblast, a village in Gavrilovsky Selsoviet of Koverninsky District; 
Belyayevo, Sokolsky District, Nizhny Novgorod Oblast, a village in Loyminsky Selsoviet of Sokolsky District;

Pskov Oblast
As of 2014, one rural locality in Pskov Oblast bears this name:
Belyayevo, Pskov Oblast, a village in Ostrovsky District

Ryazan Oblast
As of 2014, one rural locality in Ryazan Oblast bears this name:
Belyayevo, Ryazan Oblast, a village in Belovsky Rural Okrug of Klepikovsky District

Smolensk Oblast
As of 2014, two rural localities in Smolensk Oblast bear this name:
Belyayevo, Ugransky District, Smolensk Oblast, a village in Znamenskoye Rural Settlement of Ugransky District
Belyayevo, Velizhsky District, Smolensk Oblast, a village in Belyayevskoye Rural Settlement of Velizhsky District

Republic of Tatarstan
As of 2014, one rural locality in the Republic of Tatarstan bears this name:
Belyayevo, Republic of Tatarstan, a village in Kaybitsky District

Tula Oblast
As of 2014, two rural localities in Tula Oblast bear this name:
Belyayevo, Belyovsky District, Tula Oblast, a village in Belyayevsky Rural Okrug of Belyovsky District
Belyayevo, Suvorovsky District, Tula Oblast, a village in Bogdanovskaya Rural Territory of Suvorovsky District

Tver Oblast
As of 2014, four rural localities in Tver Oblast bear this name:
Belyayevo, Bezhetsky District, Tver Oblast, a village in Zhitishchenskoye Rural Settlement of Bezhetsky District
Belyayevo, Rameshkovsky District, Tver Oblast, a village in Kiverichi Rural Settlement of Rameshkovsky District
Belyayevo, Kudryavtsevskoye Rural Settlement, Toropetsky District, Tver Oblast, a village in Kudryavtsevskoye Rural Settlement of Toropetsky District
Belyayevo, Skvortsovskoye Rural Settlement, Toropetsky District, Tver Oblast, a village in Skvortsovskoye Rural Settlement of Toropetsky District

Alternative names
Belyayevo, alternative name of Belyayeva, a village in Boshinsky Rural Administrative Okrug of Karachevsky District in Bryansk Oblast; 
Belyayevo, alternative name of Bebyayevo, a village in Bebyayevsky Selsoviet of Arzamassky District in Nizhny Novgorod Oblast;

See also
Belyayev